Squizzy Taylor is a 1982 Australian drama film based on the life of Melbourne gangster, Squizzy Taylor, directed by Kevin James Dobson and starring David Atkins, Jacki Weaver and Alan Cassell.

Cast
 Alan Cassell as Det. Brophy
 David Atkins as Squizzy Taylor
 Jacki Weaver as Dolly
 Robert Hughes as Reg Harvey
 Steve Bisley as 'Snowy' Cutmore
 Michael Long as Det. Piggott
 Kim Lewis as Ida Pender
 Cul Cullen as Henry Stokes
 Peter Hosking	as Angus Murray
 Tony Rickards	as Dutch
 Simon Thorpe as Paddy
 Paul Trahair as Young Detective
 Peter Paulson	as 'Long' Harry Slater
 David Scott as 'Bunny' Whiting
 Jenni Caffin as Tart with Squizzy

Production
Writer Roger Simpson had been researching the period since he helped adapt Power Without Glory (1976.) The filmmakers also used research done by Nigel Buesst for his film on Squizzy Taylor.

The film was shot on location in Melbourne. Its critical and commercial response was limited.

Home media
Squizzy Taylor was released on DVD with a new transfer by Umbrella Entertainment in July 2007. The DVD is compatible with all region codes and includes special features such as the theatrical trailer and a featurette titled The Rise and Fall of Squizzy Taylor.

On 11 November 2012 the film was made available on Umbrella Entertainment Streaming Services.

DVD Releases

Online Streaming

See also
 Cinema of Australia

References

External links
Squizzy Taylor at the National Film and Sound Archive
 
Squizzy Taylor at Oz Movies

1982 films
Australian crime drama films
Australian biographical films
Crime films based on actual events
Australian independent films
Films shot in Melbourne
1982 crime drama films
Films scored by Bruce Smeaton
Films directed by Kevin James Dobson
1980s English-language films
1980s Australian films